The 1985 NCAA Division I men's ice hockey tournament was the culmination of the 1984–85 NCAA Division I men's ice hockey season, the 38th such tournament in NCAA history. It was held between March 22 and 30, 1985, and concluded with Rensselaer defeating Providence 2-1. All Quarterfinals matchups were held at home team venues while all succeeding games were played at the Joe Louis Arena in Detroit, Michigan.

Qualifying teams

The NCAA permitted 8 teams to qualify for the tournament and divided its qualifiers into two regions (East and West). Each of the tournament champions from the four Division I conferences (CCHA, ECAC, Hockey East and WCHA) received automatic invitations into the tournament with At-large bids making up the remaining 4 teams, 1 from each conference.

Format
The tournament featured three rounds of play. The two odd-number ranked teams from one region were placed into a bracket with the two even-number ranked teams of the other region. The teams were then seeded according to their ranking. In the Quarterfinals the first and fourth seeds and the second and third seeds played two-game aggregate series to determine which school advanced to the Semifinals. Beginning with the Semifinals all games were played at the Joe Louis Arena and all series became Single-game eliminations. The winning teams in the semifinals advanced to the National Championship Game with the losers playing in a Third Place game.

Tournament Bracket

Note: * denotes overtime period(s)

Quarterfinals

(E1) Rensselaer vs. (W4) Lake Superior State

(E2) Boston College vs. (W3) Minnesota

(W1) Michigan State vs. (E4) Providence

(W2) Minnesota–Duluth vs. (E3) Harvard

Semifinal

(E2) Boston College vs. (E4) Providence

(E1) Rensselaer vs. (W2) Minnesota–Duluth

Third Place Game

(W2) Minnesota–Duluth vs. (E2) Boston College

National Championship

(E1) Rensselaer vs. (E4) Providence

All-Tournament Team
G: Chris Terreri* (Providence)
D: Tim Friday (Rensselaer)
D: Ken Hammond (Rensselaer)
F: Adam Oates (Rensselaer)
F: George Servinis (Rensselaer)
F: Bill Watson (Minnesota-Duluth)
* Most Outstanding Player(s)

References

Tournament
NCAA Division I men's ice hockey tournament
NCAA Division I Men's Ice Hockey Tournament
NCAA Division I Men's Ice Hockey Tournament
NCAA Division I Men's Ice Hockey Tournament
NCAA Division I Men's Ice Hockey Tournament
NCAA Division I Men's Ice Hockey Tournament
NCAA Division I Men's Ice Hockey Tournament
NCAA Division I Men's Ice Hockey Tournament
Ice hockey in Boston
Ice hockey competitions in Detroit
Ice hockey in Minnesota
Ice hockey in New York (state)
Ice hockey competitions in Boston
Sports competitions in Duluth, Minnesota
Sports competitions in Michigan
Sports competitions in New York (state)
East Lansing, Michigan
Troy, New York
Sports in Rensselaer County, New York